Dongmoa silvestrii is a harvestman species in the genus Dongmoa found in Tonking.

See also
 List of Podoctidae species

Harvestmen
Animals described in 1927
Arachnids of Asia